Ventas de Huelma is a municipality located in the comarca of Alhama, province of Granada, southern Spain. It had a population of 678 in 2017.

References

Municipalities in the Province of Granada